Gerald Fitzgibbon (8 October 1866 – 6 December 1942) was an Irish judge who served as a Judge of the Supreme Court from 1924 to 1938. He also served as a Teachta Dála (TD) for the Dublin University constituency from 1921 to 1923.

Family
Fitzgibbon came from a noted legal family, his grandfather, Gerald Fitzgibbon, was a Queen's Counsel and Master in Chancery and his father, also Gerald Fitzgibbon, was a Lord Justice of the pre-independence Irish Court of Appeal: along with Christopher Palles and Hugh Holmes, the second Gerald  Fitzgibbon was credited with making the Court of Appeal a tribunal whose judgements are still quoted with respect today. Mr. Justice Fitzgibbon through his mother was the grandson of Francis Alexander FitzGerald, Baron of the Court of Exchequer.

Early life and education
Fitzgibbon was born in Dublin in 1866, into an Anglican family. He was the eldest son of Gerald Fitzgibbon and Margaret Anne Fitzgerald. He was educated at Clifton College, Bristol, and Trinity College Dublin, where he took his degree of Bachelor of Arts. He was called to the Irish Bar in 1887, practised on the Munster Circuit, became a King's Counsel in 1908, and a Bencher of the King's Inns in 1912.

Political career
He was elected unopposed to the House of Commons of Southern Ireland at the 1921 elections, representing the Dublin University constituency as an Independent Unionist, and acted as Speaker at its single session, with only four representatives attending. As a unionist he did not participate in the Second Dáil. He was re-elected for the same constituency at the 1922 general election and became a member of the Third Dáil. He did not contest the 1923 general election.

Supreme Court of the Irish Free State
In 1924, the forced retirement of almost all the senior judges of the former regime made the selection of suitable replacements a serious issue. Hugh Kennedy, the new Chief Justice of the Irish Free State, recommended Fitzgibbon as a judge of the Supreme Court of the Irish Free State simply on account of his legal ability, despite their serious differences on political issues, which Hogan refers to as a clash between Kennedy's "enthusiastic nationalism" and Fitzgibbon's "pessimistic scepticism".

Conflict with Hugh Kennedy
Kennedy soon came to regret his decision to recommend Fitzgibbon for appointment to the bench. Kennedy's diary records the increasing tension between the two men. Although Fitzgibbon was a Protestant Unionist, his friends insisted that he was by no means opposed to the new regime and indeed if he had been, he would hardly have accepted high office in it. However, he seems to have become deeply disillusioned with the increasingly Roman Catholic Irish Free State, and by 1929, he and Chief Justice Kennedy are said to have regarded each other with deep suspicion.

The tension came to a head in 1935, when Fitzgibbon was in the majority in State (Ryan) v Lennon; over  Kennedy's strong dissenting judgment, he found that the Constitution of the Irish Free State contained provisions for its own amendment which allowed for the suspension of the most basic human rights.

In Re Westby in 1934, on the straightforward question of whether a Protestant ward of court should or should not be educated at an English public school, Chief Justice Kennedy's decision that the boy should be educated in Ireland was overruled by the Supreme Court of the Irish Free State, presided over by Fitzgibbon. Kennedy regarded Fitzgibbon's judgment as a personal attack on him.

Later years
He took some interest in the enactment of the 1937 Constitution of Ireland and made some suggestions on the procedure for referring a Bill to the Supreme Court under Article 26 by the President of Ireland as a reserve power.

Despite his obvious unhappiness in his professional life, he remained on the Supreme Court of Ireland until he reached retirement age in 1938; Chief Justice Kennedy believed that his somewhat unsatisfactory pension arrangements made Fitzgibbon cling to an office he had come to despise. Hogan points out that in this regard at least Fitzgibbon had good reason to be bitter with his treatment by the Government, because he was required on age grounds to retire 9 months before he qualified for the full amount, he seems to have received a pension equivalent to only 42% of his salary.

Arms

References

External links

1866 births
1942 deaths
Independent TDs
Members of the 2nd Dáil
Members of the 3rd Dáil
People of the Irish Civil War (Pro-Treaty side)
Irish barristers
Irish Queen's Counsel
Irish Anglicans
Judges of the Supreme Court of Ireland
Alumni of Trinity College Dublin
Legislative speakers in Ireland
Teachtaí Dála for Dublin University
Members of the King's Inns
20th-century Irish judges
Alumni of King's Inns
People educated at Clifton College